Rees David was an 18th-century Welsh schoolmaster, and early Arminian Baptist. Very little is really known about him. One of his schools was in or near Newcastle Emlyn (he was one of the signatories of a letter sent to Rhydwilym church from Llandysul in 1725), but when, in 1729 he adopted Arminian views, he moved his school to Hengoed, Glamorganshire. Later(about 1730), however he unfortunately became upset with doctrinal disputes at Hengoed, David refused to compromise, and turning his back both on Hengoed and on the Baptist denomination, instead made his living as an inn-keeper in Brecknock.

According to his good friend Joshua Thomas, He died in Brecon ‘several years after 1746’.

References 

18th-century deaths
18th-century Welsh people
Arminian writers
Welsh schoolteachers